Leaving the End Open is the third studio album by the American rock group Hardline. This is their first album since 2002's II.
The new line up for the album features two new band members, Jamie Brown on bass guitar and Atma Anur on drums. The album was released on April 17, 2009 in the UK and it was released in the USA on May 2, 2009.

Japanese guitarist and video game musician Jun Senoue from Gioeli's other band, Crush 40, is listed as a special guest on the song "Before This," where he is credited for the guitar solo.

Background 
The album was called "Just Add Water" when it was in the works for seven years, beginning in 2004, but Johnny Gioeli gave the title tentatively while planning a different title. During early development in 2004, Rudy Sarzo was slated to record bass, as suggested by Michael T. Ross, but was unable to contribute due to a busy schedule consisting of touring with Yngwie Malmsteen and Ronnie James Dio. Joey Gioeli had also planned to contribute lyrics and rhythm guitar, but seemingly retired from the music industry to manage the Gioeli brothers' companies full-time. Leaving the End Open is the last of Hardline's albums produced by veteran studio man Bob Burch, as well as featuring keyboardist Michael T. Ross.

Eight known songs were to be included on the album, as revealed in 2006: "My Heart," "Hold On," a demo originally recorded by Hardline's predecessor, Brunette, "Hole in My Head," "Save Me," "Falling Rain," "Looking at the World," "I Surrender," and "What If." "Hole In My Head" is the only aforementioned song that is confirmed to have been included on the final release. "I Surrender" would go on to be released on Hardline's seventh album, Heart, Mind and Soul, in 2021.

Track listing
All songs by Johnny Gioeli and Josh Ramos, except where noted.

Personnel

Band
Johnny Gioeli - Vocals
Josh Ramos - Guitars
Michael T. Ross - Keyboards
Jamie Brown - Bass
Atma Anur - Drums

Guests
Jun Senoue - Solo Guitar ("Before This")

Charts

References

Hardline (band) albums
2009 albums
Frontiers Records albums